Doug Storer (1899–1985) was a radio producer, talent agent, and writer responsible for creating and producing radio programs from the 1930s to the 1960s, including Ripley's Believe It or Not! and Renfrew of the Royal Mounted.

External links
 Inventory of the Doug and Hazel Anderson Storer Collection, 1920s-2003, in the Southern Historical Collection, UNC-Chapel Hill

1899 births
1985 deaths